Ivan Hopta (19 September 1958 – 21 December 2021) was a Slovak politician who served as a member of the National Council. Hopta was born on 19 September 1958. He died on 21 December 2021, at the age of 63.

References

1958 births
2021 deaths
Slovak politicians
Slovak people of Rusyn descent
Members of the National Council (Slovakia) 2002-2006
Communist Party of Slovakia politicians
Dawn (Slovakia) politicians